Lynn Sedwick Hornor (November 3, 1874 – September 23, 1933) was an American politician who represented West Virginia in the United States House of Representatives from 1931 to 1933.

Hornor was born in Clarksburg, West Virginia. He attended the public schools. He was employed as a bank clerk in 1892 and served successively as cashier and director until his death. In addition, he was president and manager of a number of coal, oil and gas development, and land companies. He was president of the West Virginia Natural Gas Association in 1917 and 1918.

During the First World War, Hornor served as a member of the advisory West Virginia council of defense. He was elected as a Democrat to the Seventy-second and Seventy-third Congresses and served from March 4, 1931, until his death in Washington, D.C. in 1933. He was buried in Odd Fellows Cemetery, Clarksburg, West Virginia.

See also
 List of United States Congress members who died in office (1900–49)

External links

1874 births
1933 deaths
Politicians from Clarksburg, West Virginia
Democratic Party members of the United States House of Representatives from West Virginia
Businesspeople from Clarksburg, West Virginia